Airini Karauria Tamiwhakakiteaoterangi Donnelly or Airini Tonore (c.1855 – 7 June 1909) was a New Zealand tribal leader, lawyer, and landowner of Māori descent, she identified with the Ngati Kahungunu iwi. She served as an advocate in the Native Land Court in Rangitikei and was involved in numerous land deals that made her powerful.

She was born in Puketapu, Hawke's Bay, New Zealand where her mother was Haromi Te Ata and her father was Ngati Kahungunu chief Karauria or Karauria Pupu, She was the great-niece of Tareha Te Moananui. Following her marriage to an Irish immigrant George Prior Donnelly in 1877, she became relatively wealthy, and fell out with some of her Maori relations when she became involved in a dispute over land ownership in a case known as Broughton v. Donnelly.

References

External links 
 Dictionary of New Zealand Biography

1855 births
1909 deaths
Ngāti Kahungunu people